This article refers to the regency in Indonesia; see also Al-Quds (Jerusalem)

Kudus is a regency in Central Java province in Indonesia. Its capital is Kudus. It covers 425.16 km2 and is thus the smallest regency on Java Island in area, and it had a population of 777,437 at the 2010 Census and 849,184 at the 2020 Census, comprising 423,777 males and 425,407 females. It is located east of Semarang, the capital of Central Java.

History

The city of Kudus was something of an important Islamic holy city in the sixteenth century. It is the only place in Java that has permanently acquired an Arabic name ('al-Quds', Jerusalem). Sunan Kudus, one of the nine Wali Sanga, was said to have been the fifth imam (head) of the mosque of Demak and a major leader of the 1527 campaign against 'Majapahit', before moving to Kudus.

The Mosque of Kudus (Masjid Menara) which dates from this period, remains a local landmark to this day. It is notable for both its perseverance of pre-Islamic architectural forms such as Old Javanese split doorways and Hindu-Buddhist influenced Majapahit-style brickwork, and for its name al-Manar or al-Aqsa. The date AH 956 (AD 1549) is inscribed over the mihrab (niche indicating the direction of Mecca).

Administrative districts
The Regency comprises nine districts (kecamatan), tabulated below with their areas and their populations at the 2010 Census and the 2020 Census. The table also includes the number of administrative villages (rural desa and urban kelurahan) in each district and its post code.

Contemporary Kudus
Although most residents of Kudus are Javanese, there is an Indonesian Chinese minority in the city center, as well as an Arab neighborhood, Kudus Kulon, to the west of the city center.

The city is considered the "birthplace" of the kretek clove cigarette, which is by far the most widely smoked form of tobacco in the country, and remains a major center for their manufacture.
Haji Jamahri, a resident of the city, invented them in the 1880s.
A festival named Dandangan is held for about one whole month before Ramadhan, Muslim's fasting month in Kudus Kulon.

Anti-nuclear movement
On June 12, 2007, about 5,000 people gathered peacefully to protest against Jakarta's plan to build 4 nuclear reactors in the region. The movement included local residents, activists, artists, students and public officials, parliament members, military commandants and police chiefs. This movement has been part of a series of responses emerging from all sides of the Indonesian society against the use of nuclear technology for energy production.

Notable people
 Hariyanto Arbi, badminton player
 Hermawan Susanto, badminton player
 Liem Swie King, badminton player
 Eddy Hartono, badminton player

See also
Sunan Kudus

References

External links

Minaret at Kudus - ArchNet.org

Regencies of Central Java